Coleophora paludoides is a moth of the family Coleophoridae. It is found in Canada, including Ontario.

The larvae feed on the leaves of Myrica, Gaylussacia and Comptonia species. They create a spatulate leaf case.

References

paludoides
Moths of North America
Moths described in 1957